Michal Gallo (born 2 June 1988 in Ružomberok) is a Slovak of Peruvian ascendence football defender who currently plays for TJ Družstevník Liptovská Štiavnica.

References

External links
 

1988 births
Living people
Slovak footballers
Association football defenders
MFK Ružomberok players
FC Silon Táborsko players
MFK Zemplín Michalovce players
FC Lokomotíva Košice players
ŠKM Liptovský Hrádok players
Slovak Super Liga players
Sportspeople from Ružomberok